Pluton was a fast minelaying cruiser built for the French Navy in the late 1920s. She was also able to carry 1,000 troops on her mine deck as a fast troop transport. Shortly after completion she was modified and became a gunnery training ship, replacing the elderly armored cruiser . Shortly before the beginning of World War II, she reverted to her original role and most of the gunnery training equipment was removed. She was sent to Casablanca, in French Morocco, when the war began to lay a minefield, but the order was cancelled a day later and she was ordered to disembark her naval mines. She exploded while landing her still-fuzed mines on 13 September 1939.

Design
The Marine Nationale decided to build a fast minelayer as part of its 1925 Naval Programme after the British  made her debut in the early 1920s. Pluton was similar in many respects, also being armed with four single destroyer-caliber guns, but was smaller and faster. She could also be used as a fast transport for up to 1,000 troops. The sides of the mine deck were normally open to the weather, but metal panels could be used to close it off when carrying troops.

General characteristics
Her longitudinally framed hull was subdivided by 15 transverse watertight bulkheads. Duralumin was extensively used in the superstructure to save weight, but this resulted in corrosion problems and strength issues. She was fitted with a single counterbalanced rudder powered by an electric motor that was too weak for the job. She was totally unarmored and relied upon her watertight subdivision for survival.

Propulsion
Pluton had a two-shaft unit machinery layout with alternating boiler and engine rooms. An auxiliary boiler was fitted to heat or cool the ship's magazines and provide drinking water. A pair of  turbo generators provided electricity at 235 volts. Two  diesel generators were mounted in the aft engine room to provide power while in harbor and a third was installed in a special compartment on the first deck for emergency use.

Armament
Pluton was originally intended to carry two single turrets, one each fore and aft, with  guns, four  anti-aircraft (AA) guns and four light  AA guns. However four  guns were substituted for the 203 mm guns before construction began and six more 37 mm guns were added in lieu of the 75 mm guns during construction although the baseplates for the 75 mm guns were retained for future use.

The four 138 mm 40-caliber guns were on M1924 mounts with gun shields. Two guns each were fore and aft in superfiring positions on the centerline. Their elevation limits were -10° to +35° and they had a 270° arc of fire. Their rate of fire was a nominal eight to nine rounds per minute, but proved to be considerably less in service. One powder and one shell magazine served each pair of guns, each of which had their own individual hoist.

Ten 37 mm/50 cal semi-automatic AA guns were carried by Pluton. Two were fitted on the foredeck, six amidships between the funnels and two on a platform at the stern. 10,000 rounds were carried with 144 rounds in ready-use boxes near each gun. The guns could depress 15° and elevate to 80°. All of these guns—except for the pair on the stern—were removed shortly after Pluton was commissioned in 1932.

Twelve obsolete  Hotchkiss M1914 machine guns were carried in six twin mounts. Two mounts were on top of the bridge, two atop the after boiler room ventilator housing and two just forward of the tripod mainmast. 48,000 rounds were provided for them. They were removed shortly after Pluton was commissioned in 1932.

Pluton was designed to carry 220  Sautter-Harlé mines, but had space for 30 extra, for a total of 250. They were carried on the first deck, or mine deck, using a system of four rails along the sides of the ship and moved via chain-drives. Each pair of rails converged on a turntable at the forward end of the rails and a transverse spur connected the two turntables. The spur facilitated loading mines from one side of the ship and allowed mines to be moved to each of the rails. The rails ended in four ramps at the stern of the ship that sloped down at a 30° angle to minimize the shock of impact when the mines were released from the chain drive. Up to 270 of the smaller Bréguet B4 mines could be carried.

Service
She entered service with the French Mediterranean Fleet in 1932. Pluton experienced many teething problems, particularly with the machinery. Shortly after she was commissioned the Navy decided to give her an extra role as a gunnery training ship and she entered Toulon Dockyard for the necessary modifications on 24 October 1932. Quarters for 40 men were added on the mine deck. Most of the 37-mm AA guns and all of the 8 mm machine guns were replaced by four 50-caliber 75 mm Canon de 75 mm Mle 22 or 24 AA guns and 12  Hotchkiss machine guns on six twin mounts, two mounts where the 37 mm guns had been mounted on the foredeck and four between the funnels. The 75 mm guns had a maximum depression of 10° and a maximum elevation of 90°. The Hotchkiss guns had a cyclic rate of fire of 450 rounds per minute, but the practical rate was between 200 and 250 rounds per minute to allow for reloading its 30-round magazines. A simple fire-control director was added for the 138 mm guns and 15 additional rangefinders were installed for use by the Rangefinding School.

Pluton spent much of 1933–1935 in dockyard hands after finishing her first round of modifications on 27 April 1933. She was refitted four times during this period to add more gunnery equipment and to rectify some of her defects. These included reinforcement of her superstructure where it had been damaged by the muzzle blast from her 138 mm guns and replacement of her corroded aluminum ladders and booms with steel ones. A high-angle fire-control director for her 75 mm guns was added, two of her 75 mm gun were converted to powered, remotely controlled mounts, gun shields were added to the 75 mm guns to protect their crews from blast and facilities for another 40 men was installed on her mine deck.

In 1936, an experimental twin 13.2 mm gun mount with a gun shield was added between the starboard 75-mm guns and more rangefinders were added to bring her total up to 31. Her boilers and condensers were repaired in a refit between 25 November 1936 and 13 March 1937. Later that year Pluton had a major refit that involved repair of her turbines, replacement of her 138 mm fire-control director by one of the type used by the  light cruisers and the transfer of the foredeck 13.2 mm machine guns to positions on the forward superstrucut. Her last refit, from 15 November 1938 – 15 February 1939, retubed two boilers, enclosed the AA director to protect it from the weather, improved the remote control of the 138 mm guns and added gun shields to each of the twin 13.2 mm mounts.

Pluton was transferred to Lorient on 10 May 1939 when the French Navy formed the 5e Escadre there which controlled all training ships and planned to convert her into a full-time training ship as consort to the training cruiser  on 1 June 1940. She would have been renamed La Tour d'Auvergne at that time, as the name Pluton was reserved for mine warfare ships in the French Navy.

As war approached, it was decided to retain her as a minelayer and most of the extra fire control equipment was removed. She was transferred to Brest as part of the reorganization of the 5e Escadre. She sailed for Casablanca, French Morocco on 2 September with 125 Bréguet mines embarked. She was ordered to lay a defensive minefield there on 4 September, but this order was rescinded the next day, after the mines had already been fuzed, and the ship was ordered to disembark the mines. While landing the mines on 13 September one of them exploded, destroying the ship and killing 186 people. A further 73 crewmen and 47 others were injured and significant damage was caused by flying debris. Three trawlers (Etoile du Matin, Marie Merveilleuse, and Sultan) were sunk by the explosion, and the auxiliary minesweepers Charcot, Gosse, and Chellah damaged beyond repair. Two other auxiliary minesweepers, Grodin and Alcor, were damaged but able to be repaired. One gun and some armor was salvaged during the war, but demolition work did not begin until October 1952 and was completed by July 1953.

Notes

Bibliography

Cruisers of the French Navy
Ships built in France
1929 ships
World War II cruisers of France
World War II shipwrecks in the Mediterranean Sea
Maritime incidents in September 1939
Minelayers of the French Navy
Ships sunk by non-combat internal explosions